Mercedes-Benz Fintail is a nickname for saloon cars of the W110, W111, and W112 series produced by Mercedes from 1959 to 1968.  These replaced the Ponton-series saloon cars introduced in 1953.

These series' modest tailfin-era styling reflected the US-led trend.  In Mercedes terminology, the short rear fins were designated  (from  ‘take a bearing, find the direction’ +   ‘bar’), parking aids which marked the end of the car for aid in backing. 

The production series included:
 Four-cylinder saloon cars
 1961–68 Mercedes-Benz W110 — 190c, 190Dc (1961–65), 200, 200D, 230 (1961–65)
 Six-cylinder saloon cars
 1959–68 Mercedes-Benz W111 — 220b, 220Sb, 220SEb, 230S
 1961–65 Mercedes-Benz W112 — 300SE

References

External links

 heckflosse.nl

Fintail